Theseus and the Minotaur is a 1982 video game published by TSR for the Apple II.

Gameplay
Theseus and the Minotaur is a hi-res 3D maze game in which the object is to find the princess Ariadne and lead her to the maze entrance.

Reception
Chris Smith reviewed Theseus and the Minotaur in The Space Gamer No. 57. Smith commented that "Overall, this is a good game. The maze is different every time, though I can find no real difference between a complexity 1 and a complexity 100 game (they give you a choice at the beginning of each game). If the mental challenge of finding the secret doors and mapping out the labyrinth despite the halls of mirrors appeals to you, then I recommend this game."

References

External links
Review in Softline

1982 video games
Apple II games
Apple II-only games
Maze games
Single-player video games
TSR, Inc. games
Video games based on Greek mythology
Video games developed in the United States